The 2017–18 season is Indian Arrows' 4th competitive season in the top-flight of Indian football, I-league. Indian Arrows was formed in 2010 on the behest on then Indian team coach, Bob Houghton, with the main goal of nurturing young talent in India in the hope of qualifying for 2018 FIFA World Cup in Russia. It was disbanded by AIFF in 2013 when their club sponsor, Pailan Group, could not financially support the group.

It was revived again for 2017–18 season and fielded the team in 2017-18 I-League after the successful hosting of 2017 FIFA U-17 World Cup to give more game time to U-17 world cup players and best talent from U-19 players who recently played in 2018 AFC U-19 Championship qualification.
They will play in Goa and Delhi as their home grounds.

Indian Arrows ended their I-League campaign on 27 February 2018 finishing last in the league but will not be relegated since it was formed as development side by AIFF. They got selected for qualifying match of 2018 Indian Super Cup but were eliminated losing to Mumbai City.

Season overview

November 
On 14 November, AIFF has named its development side for 2017-18 I-League after disbanding it in 2013. A bit of focus will be on the side that will comprise the best talent from the team that competed in the FIFA U-17 World Cup and the Under-19 team.  The idea is to keep the boys together to make the cut for 2019 FIFA U-20 World Cup for which India has submitted a bid application.

On 28 November, AIFF announced squad for this season, consisting mostly of U-17 World-Cup players and some U-19 national players. There are no foreign players in this squad. It is also announced that first 2 home matches will be played in Goa with rest of the home matches to be played in New Delhi.

On 29 November, Indian Arrows started off the I-League campaign on a winning note with 3–0 win against Chennai City at home. Aniket scored a brace followed by a 90th-minute goal from Boris to ensure three points for youngsters. For the first goal, Boris, from his half, relayed ball to Rahul on the right and latter sent in a cross inside a box for Aniket to unleash a powerful shot that found roof of the net. Arrows came up with a counter-attack for second goal which saw Lalrindika latching on long-ball before squaring it for Aniket who shot home to make scoreline 2–0. Boris took advantage of Chennai City's sloppy defence and hammered third goal in 90th minute.

December 
On 5 December goal in each half from William helped Minerva Punjab beat Indian Arrows by 2–0. Khosla laid it for William after a long throw-in by Sukhdev and the powerful long-ranger by the Ghanaian ruptured through the Arrows defence, going past a hapless Dheeraj into the goal in the seventh minute. William brushed aside Jitendra and slotted the ball at the back of the net, this time from Chencho's cross in the 84th minute to seal the win for Minerva Punjab.

On 18 December, Minerva Punjab completely outplayed Indian Arrows but Arrows somehow managed to keep scoreline 0–0 at half-time with brilliant saves from their custodian Dheeraj. The match was headed into certain draw until Chencho scored solitary goal for Minerva and took the match away in 80th minute with a brilliant solo effort.

On 22 December, a goal at the beginning of the each half by Gokulam Kerala helped them register victory over Indian Arrows who produced a spirited performance but failed to post any goals. Gokulam's Addo headed Mirza's corner into Arrow's net for first goal. In 58th minute, Stalin curled a vicious right-footer off a free-kick which beat Gokulam keeper Bilal but struck upright. Al Saleh curled a looping left-footer off free-kick to beat Dheeraj in goal and double Gokulam's lead in 64th minute.

On 26 December, Indian Arrows drub Shillong Lajong 3–0 in an impressive show of passing football. Arrows's quick free-kick took Lajong by surprise and Jitendra beat the opposition to put the ball at the bottom right corner of the goal making him the youngest goal-scorer in I-League. At the hour mark, Lalrohlua's game ended early after he went hard at Arrows forward Rahim Ali, earning his second yellow card to bring Lajong down to 10 men.  In 86th minute, Naorem put the game out of Lajong's reach as he dribbled past six defenders and slotted the ball home. Rahul then struck in the first minute of the injury-stoppage time to make it 3–0.

On 29 December, Indian Arrows despite playing with 10-men managed to hold off Mohun Bagan to 1–1 draw at Kolkata. Mohun Bagan took the penalty route to take lead in the 27th minute through Dipanda after Arrows' got penalised for Ashish's contact with Mariners' Nikhil. But Arrows restored parity within 6 minutes when Rahim raced past Kingshuk and Kingsley from the left before Rahul slotting it home. In 65th minute, Amarjit was sent off for the second booking in the match but Arrows put up a solid show with fine saves from  Dheeraj to hold on to a draw.

On 31 December, Indian Arrows' custodian Dheeraj's contract expired as he chose to pursue opportunities in Europe.

January 
On 2 January, Indian Arrows failed to score points against table leaders, East Bengal as they went down 0–2 in a home encounter. The two early goals by Amnah and Yusa for visiting side put pressure on Arrows. Arrows came back strongly in an evenly-contested second half but a goal eluded them as they failed to give finishing touches in crucial moments.

On 5 January, A first-half brace by Subhash helped NEROCA outplay a young Indian Arrows side for the majority of the game. Israilov released a well-weighted through-ball into the path of Subhash who chipped Prabshukhan with aplomb. In 45th minute, Chidi split the Arrows defence and Subhash slotted the ball into the net to end the half with a two-goal lead for NEROCA. Birthday boy Abhijit scored a late consolation goal for the Arrows tapping in cross from Rahul.

On 6 January, it has been reported that Arrows players have signed contracts till end of 2019–20 season, except for Jeakson Singh, Anwar Ali and Nongdamba Naorem, who are on loan from Minerva Punjab. They also got Princeton Rebello on loan from Goan FC. AIFF also announced its decision to replace their heroic goalie Dheeraj with U-19 goalkeeper, Lara Singh. FC Goa announced signing of Mohammad Nawaz on January 9.

On 8 January, Indian Arrows lost 0–1 in a hard-fought encounter with Shillong Lajong. Arrows started the match on backfoot as Lajong took more aggressive approach. Lajong attacked Arrows' defence but young goalie Prabshukhan made some impressive saves including Lalmuanpuia's spot-kick after Deepak's handball inside the box. Lajong's winning goal finally came in the 80th minute when forward Koffi raced into the box, past the outstretched Jitendra and delivered a wonderful shot into the roof of the net.

On 12 January, Abhijit was on target as Indian Arrows beat Gokulam Kerala 1–0. Arrows' were steaming in their pursuit of some much-needed points as their defenders, especially Boris did a tremendous job to tame Odafa and make a positive impact in the match. At half-time, Rahim came very close to scoring the opening goal but Bilal jumped at the right time to get hold of the cross flown by Rahul. The deadlock was finally broken by the Abhijit in the 77th minute as Rahul from the left flank tried his luck only for Bilal to palm it away to Abhijit who put the Arrows in lead.

On 16 January, Indian Arrows lost to NEROCA 0–2 in a home encounter conceding one goal in each half. NEROCA had scoring chances but couldn't penetrate Arrows' defence until Anwar Ali committed a mistake to score an own goal in the 18th minute. Arrows later attacked from the flanks but found the going tough against the rival defenders. With the Arrows doing most of the attack, NEROCA played it safe before Chidi scored after getting past Arrows' defender and the keeper to slot the ball into the net.

On 22 January, Indian Arrows lost 0–2 to Churchill Brothers. Churchill Brothers dominated the proceedings throughout but were frustrated by Arrows' defenders until 88th minute. Arrows' made some quick counter moves, especially from Rahul but could not get past defender, Monday and custodian Kithan. Desperate attempts by opposition in dying minutes finally managed to score twice in 88th minute and later in injury-time by defender Ceesey after deflection from Anwar Ali and substitute Gurung through free-kick from Koffi.

On 27 January, Goalkeeper Prabshukhan put up a commendable performance as Indian Arrows held Chennai City to a goalless draw in an away I-League encounter. Chennai City started to make their attacking intentions clear in the first half as they scooped up a number of chances but injuries played the spoilsport as Chennai City's Pradeep and Arrows' forward Rahim Ali have to leave the field. Arrows continued to show composure and maintain their defensive shape until the final whistle which earned them a point.

February 
On 5 February, Omagbemi's late strike with a looped header helped East Bengal to secure a narrow win over Indian Arrows. It was heartbreak for Indian youngsters as they put up a stellar defence, only to fall short in the dying minutes. Earlier, Arrows forward Abhijit had a golden opportunity when he found himself in a one-on-one position with Ubaid but he hit the ball straight at the East Bengal custodian. Later, Stalin set it up with a brilliant cross but Rahul headed it out with Ubaid coming out of his line.

On 10 February, Substitute Abhijit scored two injury-time goals in as many minutes as Indian Arrows rallied to pull off a stunning 2–1 victory over Churchill Brothers. Arrows started the match positively as Naorem threatened in the 8th minute when he picked up Deepak's pass whose curler forced a very good save from Kithan to keep the ball out. But, it was Churchill who broke the deadlock with Nicholas surging forward with the ball to deliver an accurate cross into the box, which was easily nodded in by an unmarked Ceesay. As the match entered the injury time, Abhijit equalised with a right-footed shot from the centre of the box to the top right corner off a Boris assist. He then scored the all-important goal two minutes later.

On 16 February, Aizawl FC drew 2–2 against a resilient Indian Arrows in an away match. Ionescu produced brilliant delivery for Saighani who slotted it past a helpless Prabhsukhan in 40th minute. Indian Arrows was quick to find the equalizer on the 48th minute as Ashish found Lalrindika with an exquisite delivery, who foxed his marker to trigger a shot at the bottom right corner which beat a diving Avilash. Aizawl continued to pile pressure and in 54th minute, Dodoz pierced the net after latching on to a pass from inside the box by Zohmingmawia. The blue colts finally equalized in the dying minutes when skipper Amarjit converted penalty after Lalrosanga brought down Rahul inside the box.

On 23 February, Indian Arrows lost 3–0 to Aizawl F.C. in an away encounter. In the 7th minute, Lalkhawpuimawia skipped past Stalin and shot towards goal but Arrows' custodian Prabhsukhan failed to grab as it found its way to Ionescu who easily found the back of the net. In the 16th minute, Lalkhawpuimawia slipped from the guard of the Arrows defenders and shot only to hit woodwork but didn't miss on the rebound. Lalkhawpuimawia scored his second in the 87th minute after Dodoz provided him with a perfect pass from the back.

On 27 February, Indian Arrows completed their I-League campaign on a losing note after losing 0–2 to Mohun Bagan and finishing last in the league but not relegated being the development team. Jitendra failed to read Watson's long ball into the box as Dicka find back of the net with a half-volley to give Mohun Bagan the lead. In few minutes before half-time, Moghrabi connected to a cross from the left by Gurjinder to double their lead. Anwar Ali and Rahul got their chances in second-half but failed to connect.

On the virtue of finishing outside top-6 in I-League, they have to play qualifier for Indian Super Cup against Mumbai City.

March 
On 16 March, Indian Arrows failed to qualify for 2018 Indian Super Cup after losing 2–1 to Mumbai City in qualifiers. It was even in the first half though Arrows upped their game until in 76th minute when Rahul broke the deadlock by scoring a brilliant goal as he latched on to a perfect through-ball by Aniket. Later, Mumbai equalized eventually through Emaná's penalty kick awarded to them when Ashish brought down Santos inside the box which pulled the game into extra time. Santos scored winner past Prabhsukhan at the flag-end of the first half of the extra time chesting down long ball that knocked Indian Arrows out of the tournament.

Coaching staff

Squad information
Indian Arrows project was reinstated after 3 years. On 28 November 2017, AIFF announced squad for this season, consisting mostly of U-17 World-Cup players and some U-19 national players. This is considered as development squad for young and upcoming talent in India.

First-team squad
{|class="wikitable" style="text-align:center; font-size:90%; width:80%;"
|-
!style="background:#034694; color:white; text-align:center;"|No.
!style="background:#034694; color:white; text-align:center;"|Name
!style="background:#034694; color:white; text-align:center;"|Nationality
!style="background:#034694; color:white; text-align:center;"|Date of Birth (Age)
|-
!colspan=5 text-align:center;"|Goalkeepers
|-
|20
|Prabhsukhan Singh Gill
|
|
|-
|30
|Lara Singh
|
| -
|-
!colspan=5 text-align:center;"|Defenders
|-
|2
|Boris Singh Thangjam
|
|
|-
|3
|Jitendra Singh
|
|
|-
|4
|Anwar Ali
|
|
|-
|5
|Sanjeev Stalin
|
|
|-
|18
|Ashish Rai
|
|
|-
|21
|Roshan Singh
|
|
|-
|22
|Deepak Tangri
|
|
|-
|25
|Sumit Rathi
|
|
|-
|26
|Narender Gahlot
|
| -
|-
!colspan=5 text-align:center;"|Midfielders
|-
|6
|Suresh Singh Wangjam
|
|
|-
|7
|Ninthoinganba Meetei
|
|
|-
|8
|Amarjit Singh Kiyam (captain)
|
|
|-
|9
|Abhijit Sarkar
|
|
|-
|12
|Princeton Rebello
|
|
|-
|13
|Lalengmawia
|
|
|-
|15
|Jeakson Singh Thounaojam
|
|
|-
|16
|Nongdamba Naorem
|
|
|-
|17
|Rahul Praveen
|
|
|-
|19
|Abhishek Halder
|
|
|-
|23
|Namgyal Bhutia
|
| -
|-
|24
|Ashish Pradhan
|
| -
|-
!colspan=5 text-align:center;"|Forwards
|-
|10
|Edmund Lalrindika
|
|
|-
|11
|Aniket Jadhav
|
|
|-
|14
|Rahim Ali
|
|
|-

Transfers

In

Loan-in

Out

Competitions

Overview

I-League

League table

Result summary

Results by match

Matches

The fixtures for the 2017–18 season were announced on 13 November 2017.

Super Cup

On the virtue of finishing outside top-6 in I-League, Indian Arrows have to play qualification match against Mumbai City at Bhubaneshwar. They were eliminated in the qualifiers on losing 2–1 to Mumbai City.

Statistics

Appearances and goals

|-
! colspan=12 style=background:#dcdcdc; text-align:center| Goalkeepers

 
|-
! colspan=12 style=background:#dcdcdc; text-align:center| Defenders
|-

 

|-
! colspan=12 style=background:#dcdcdc; text-align:center| Midfielders
|-

|-
! colspan=12 style=background:#dcdcdc; text-align:center| Forwards
|-

|-
! colspan=12 style=background:#dcdcdc; text-align:center| Players who left club in August/January transfer window or on loan

Updated: 16 March 2018

Goal scorers
The list is sorted by shirt number when total goals are equal.

Clean sheets
The list is sorted by shirt number when total clean sheets are equal.

Disciplinary record
Includes all competitive matches. Players listed below made at least one appearance for Indian Arrows during the season.

Awards

Hero of the Match

Achievements
 Abhijit Sarkar was top Indian goal-scorer for 2017-18 I-League scoring 4 goals in 14 matches.

Reaction
AIFF announced on May 9, 2018 that AIFF technical committee has approved for one-year extension to coach, Luis Norton de Matos and the same needs to be ratified by the Executive Committee.

References

See also
India national under-23 football team
India national under-19 football team
India national under-17 football team

2017–18 I-League by team
Indian Arrows FC seasons